Love/Juice is a 2000 Japanese film directed by Kaze Shindō. This is the debut feature film for Shindō (granddaughter of Kaneto Shindo).

Love/Juice received the Wolfgang Staudte Prize for Best Film at the 2001 Berlin Film Festival.

Plot 
Twenty-something lesbian Chinatsu shares a one-bedroom apartment with heterosexual Kyoko. Although Chinatsu and Kyoko have a passing attraction, Kyoko is mostly interested in men, especially one who tends the fish in a pet store, who despite her efforts, doesn't seem to be interested in her.

Cast and characters
Mika Okuno as Chinatsu
Chika Fujimura as Kyoko
Hidetoshi Nishijima as Sakamoto
Toshiya Nagasawa

References

External links
 Love/Juice at Arsenal Film Institute (in German)

2000 films
2000 LGBT-related films
Japanese drama films
2000s Japanese-language films
Japanese LGBT-related films
Lesbian-related films
LGBT-related drama films
2000 drama films
2000s Japanese films
Films produced by Kazutoshi Wadakura